Harold Ellis Tomlinson PhD (1916–1997) was an English educationist and heraldist. He designed many civic and corporate coats of arms, served as heraldic advisor to local government associations, and published monographs on the subject.

Early life
Tomlinson was born in Cheshire, and moved to The Fylde in 1928. He attended Baines’ School as a boy, became Senior Prefect in 1933, and returned as a master in 1940 becoming a legend in his own lifetime affectionately known to generations of boys as 'Toss'. He loved his football and was a great fan of Blackpool FC

Career
His heraldic publications were The Heraldry of Manchester (1944), The Heraldry of Cheshire (1946), The Armorial Bearings of the Caernarvonshire County Council (1950) and Heraldry in Insurance (1950). He provided the illustrations for Sir George Wollaston's Heraldry (1960) and C.J. Smith's The Civic Heraldry of Warwickshire (1974).  His doctoral dissertation was on French Historical Elements in the Civic Heraldry of the United Kingdom (1985).

Tomlinson was heraldic advisor to the Rural District Councils Association from 1954 to 1974, and to the Association of District Councils.  He designed arms for many local authorities and corporate bodies in England, Australia and South Africa.

Welsh and english arms included those of Calderdale, Pocklington, the City of Salford, Teignbridge, the Gemmological Association of Great Britain and the Football Association of Wales (he was a keen football player and coach).

Australian arms included those of the City of Canterbury (New South Wales), Hurstville City Council, the City of Rockdale and the City of Wagga Wagga.

South African arms included those of George, Western Cape, Wellington, Western Cape and Worcester, Western Cape, and the South African Institute of Electrical Engineers.

He also designed the arms of the University of the West Indies.
His favourite football coaching phrase was "'av a dabble".

H. Ellis Tomlinson also wrote a history of Blackpool FC, Seasiders - The First 100 years 1887-1987, published by Blackpool FC.

References

1916 births
1997 deaths
English educational theorists
Heraldic artists